Castroville Multimodal Station is a future train station in Castroville, California. It is planned to serve both Caltrain and Amtrak California's Capitol Corridor trains as part of the Monterey County Rail Extension. The station will be located along Del Monte Avenue between Blackie Road and Wood Street. It is expected to open after track improvements in the area and commencement of service to Salinas.

References

External links
 Monterey County Rail Extension Phase 3: Castroville — Transportation Agency for Monterey County station planning

Railway stations in Monterey County, California
Future Caltrain stations
Amtrak stations in California
Future Amtrak stations in the United States